The Society of Solicitors in the Supreme Courts of Scotland is a voluntary professional association of solicitors in Scotland, representing lawyers who practise in and around the College of Justice.  The College of Justice comprises Scotland's two supreme courts: the Court of Session and the High Court of Justiciary. Members use the abbreviation "SSC" after their names.

The Society was founded in January 1784 and incorporated by Royal Charter in 1797.

It is one of several similar societies in Scotland, along with the Society of Writers to the Signet in Edinburgh, the Royal Faculty of Procurators in Glasgow and the Society of Advocates in Aberdeen.

References

Further reading

External links
 

 

 
Organisations based in Edinburgh
Legal organisations based in Scotland
Solicitors in the Supreme Courts
College of Justice